3C 47 is a Seyfert galaxy / lobe-dominated quasar located in the constellation Pisces.  It was the first quasar found with the classic double radio-lobe structure.

References

Quasars
Seyfert galaxies
Pisces (constellation)
047
2817500